United States Lines was the trade name of an organization of the United States Shipping Board (USSB), Emergency Fleet Corporation (EFC) created to operate German liners seized by the United States in 1917. The ships were owned by the USSB and all finances of the line were controlled by the EFC.

Eventually the line was sold and went private to continue operating as a transatlantic shipping company that operated cargo services from 1921 to 1989, and ocean liners until 1969—most famously, .

1920s

United States Lines was the trade name of the United States Shipping Board's Emergency Fleet Corporation (EFC) organization created to operate the large German liners seized by the United States in 1917. On 15 November 1921 the line began operating from piers 3 and 4 at the USSB's Hoboken Terminal which had been the Hamburg America Line facilities in Hoboken, New Jersey seized by the United States and, during the war, operated by the Army as the Hoboken Port of Embarkation. The USSB engaged in advertising of the line and its ships through agencies using a "coupon" system to collect names and addresses of interested persons for direct mailings. All the line's funds were managed by the USSB Treasurer.
 
The line started with three ships from the tonnage of the failed United States Mail Steamship Company.  One of the founders was Kermit Roosevelt, son of US President Theodore Roosevelt. Two of the ships, America and George Washington, were originally German vessels that had been seized during World War I and kept as reparations. Both America and George Washington made New York–Bremen runs, while Centennial State ran from New York to London.

The line became well known in the 1920s when two valiant historic rescues were made using their ships President Roosevelt in 1926 and America in 1929 by Captain George Fried.

More ships were acquired in 1922 and renamed after US presidents. The 52,000-ton , formerly Vaterland and one of the largest liners in the world, was acquired in 1923.

Throughout the 1920s, the line accumulated debt, and in March 1929, the line was sold to P.W. Chapman Company, and reorganized as the "United States Lines Inc." of Delaware. The stock market crash made matters worse, and in 1931, the remaining ships were sold to "United States Lines Company" of Nevada. Later in 1931, United States Lines was acquired by the Roosevelt International Mercantile Marine Company, which had been formed earlier in the year from the merger of the Roosevelt Steamship Company and International Mercantile Marine Co.

1930s
In 1940, a new  joined them.

In 1932, United States Lines had offered to build a new passenger liner, called U.S. Express Liner, which would also double as a mail ship, and would dramatically decrease the time of delivery for trans-Atlantic mail by catapulting an aircraft when it was within range. Congress refused to give a guarantee on trans-Atlantic postal rates and it was never built.

During the 1930s, United States Lines' ailing parent company, Roosevelt International Mercantile Marine, began winding down its other operations and merging several of its divisions into United States Lines. United States Lines absorbed the American Line in 1932, the Baltimore Mail Line in 1937, and the American Merchant Line in 1938.

1940s
The decade started with United States Lines absorbing the Roosevelt Line in 1940, leaving United States Lines as Roosevelt International Mercantile Marine's sole operating business. Roosevelt International Mercantile Marine Company finally changed its name to "United States Lines Inc." in 1942, reflecting its new focus.

In World War II, the ships were converted into troopships. Manhattan became , and Washington became . The flagship America became the  After the war, the company began to build smaller and cheaper ships, and operated a number of cargo ships, all named beginning with "American" or "Pioneer".

Duquesne Spy Ring

In 1941, two Nazi spies, Franz Joseph Stigler and Erwin Wilhelm Siegler, worked for United States Lines as members of SS Americas crew. While on America, they obtained information about the movement of ships and military defense preparations at the Panama Canal, observed and reported defense preparations in the Canal Zone, and met with other German agents to advise them in their espionage pursuits. They operated as couriers, transmitting information between the United States and German agents aboard. Stigler worked undercover as the chief butcher. Both remained on America until the US Navy converted her into USS West Point.

Stigler and Siegler, along with the 31 other German agents of the Duquesne Spy Ring, were later uncovered by the FBI in the largest espionage conviction in US history. Stigler was sentenced to serve 16 years in prison on espionage charges with two concurrent years for registration violations; Siegler was sentenced to ten years imprisonment on espionage charges and a concurrent 2-year term for violation of the Registration Act.

Expansion and bankruptcy

With a government subsidy for her construction,  entered service in 1952. She holds the record as the largest ocean liner built in the United States and the fastest ocean liner ever built. But competition from airliners brought the glory days to an end; in 1964, America was sold to Chandris Line, and United States was withdrawn from service in 1969. She is presently docked along the Delaware River in South Philadelphia.

After the termination of passenger services, United States Lines continued to operate as a container ship line, being bought by containerization pioneer Malcom McLean in 1978. By the 1980s, the line operated 43 vessels and was a leader in international shipping. It spent over  billion in rapidly expanding its fleet and acquiring two competitors, Moore-McCormack Lines and Delta Steamship Lines. In expectation of a worldwide surge in oil prices, United States Lines borrowed heavily to construct a new class of 12 fuel-efficient container ships known as the Jumbo Econships that, at over 57,000 gross tons, were the largest cargo ships yet built. Just as the new vessels were delivered, international freight rates fell and oil prices collapsed to near historic lows. The giant and slow Econships left United States Lines overcapacity, deeply in debt, and unable to compete with faster ships that were once again economically viable. Straining under the debt accumulated by the fleet expansion, the company filed for bankruptcy on 24 November 1986 in one of the largest bankruptcies in US history at the time. Most of the vessels were sold to pay creditors and in the reorganization plan filed on 5 July 1988, the company was formally liquidated by 1992.

Legacy
Pursuant to the revised reorganization plan approved by the bankruptcy court in 1989, United States Lines Inc. was restructured as Janus Industries Inc. in November 1990, with its shares distributed to United States Lines creditors and the court-managed bankruptcy trust fund. The company's new management spent several years searching for new business opportunities, finally acquiring Pre-Tek Wireline Service Company, a provider of services to the oil, gas, and logging industries in 1996. In 1997, Janus acquired a number of hospitality assets from companies affiliated with the investors Louis S. Beck and Harry Yeaggy, gaining ownership of 6 hotels, an 85% interest in a 7th hotel, a management company operating another 21 hotels, a fee-sharing joint venture with another management company on another property, and control of two mortgaged-backed loans. Beck and Yeaggy gained control of 43% of Janus Industries, and the former United States Lines decided to concentrate exclusively on the hotel business. Pre-Tek Wireline was spun off to its management in 1998 and Janus Industries changed its name again to Janus Hotels & Resorts Inc. in 1999.

United States Lines' successor company now controls hotels and resorts in 21 states.

The name United States Lines was revived briefly in 2000 and 2001, as a brand name of American Classic Voyages, operating cruises in Hawaii with a single ship, MS Patriot, formerly Holland America Line's Nieuw Amsterdam. Construction had begun in 2000 on the future , and a 72,000-ton sister ship as part of Project America, but in October 2001, the company filed for bankruptcy and ceased operations. The two unfinished vessels were acquired by Norwegian Cruise Line for their new NCL America division, while Patriot was repossessed by Holland America.

A new container shipping services company called US Lines LLC (Not related to the original company in any way) was established in Santa Ana, California in 2003 by CMA CGM. However, the company announced on December 6, 2016, that US Lines would be phased out and re-branded as ANL.

Several piers in New York City remain as artifacts left behind by the company. Pier 76, United States Lines Terminal, was constructed as a cargo pier on West Side Highway at what was then the foot of 36th Street, and is now in use by Classic Car Club Manhattan, who took over the pier's lease from the NYPD in April 2016. Neon letters spelling "United States Lines" are located on the west side of the pier, facing New Jersey. One letter, "I", on the sign was working until sometime in the 2000s. The sign can be seen by the arriving NY Waterway ferry passengers or those taking the New York Circle Line water tour of Manhattan. The pier head building facing the street is also marked with the Line's name, at each end. Pier 86, United States Lines' passenger pier, still exists, although the pier building has been demolished. The Intrepid Sea, Air & Space Museum is now based there, with  permanently berthed at the pier. In Newport News, Virginia, where many of the United States Lines ships were built, one of the huge propellers from United States is on display at the entrance of the Mariners' Museum.

On February 4, 2016, Crystal Cruises announced a proposal to re-activate the former flagship of the United States Lines, SS United States, for passenger service. Crystal signed a purchase option for the ship and will cover docking costs in Philadelphia for nine months while it conducts a feasibility study. However, Crystal Cruise backed out in August 2016 due to challenges.

On December 10, 2018, the conservancy announced an agreement with the commercial real estate firm RXR Realty, of New York City, to explore options for restoring and redeveloping the ocean liner. In 2015, RXR had expressed interest in developing an out-of-commission ocean liner as a hotel and event venue at Pier 57 in New York. RXR's press release about the United States stated that multiple locations would be considered, depending on the viability of restoration plans.

Ships

Footnotes

References

External links
 Passenger Lists from the United States Lines GG Archives
 Baltimore Mail Line History and Ephemera GG Archives
 United States Lines (USL) History and Ephemera GG Archives

 
Transport companies established in 1921
Transport companies disestablished in 1992
Container shipping companies of the United States
Defunct shipping companies of the United States
Shipping companies of the United States
Transatlantic shipping companies
Container shipping companies